The Chinese Ambassador to Papua New Guinea is the official representative of the People's Republic of China to the Independent State of Papua New Guinea.

List of representatives

China–Papua New Guinea relations

References 

 
China
Papua New Guinea